The Celebration (also known as Grand Celebration) was a cruise ship originally built for Carnival Cruise Line. She was the last out of three ships to be built for Carnival's Holiday Class of cruise ships. She last sailed for Bahamas Paradise Cruise Line between 2015 and 2020.

The Grand Celebration has since been retired for scrap in 2020 along with her remaining sister ship the Holiday and other ships that were also retired due the economic losses from cruise operations being suspended worldwide following the COVID-19 pandemic. A third sister ship named Jubilee was last operated by HNA Tourism. Jubilee was retired and was broken up for scrap in 2017.

History

The ship was built as the Celebration in 1986 by Kockums Varv in Malmö, Sweden for Carnival Cruise Lines. The Celebration began operating for Carnival on 14 March 1987. She remained in the fleet for over 20 years until she was retired from the Carnival fleet in April 2008. After leaving the fleet, Celebration underwent an extensive refit and re-entered service with Carnival's subsidiary Iberocruceros as the Grand Celebration in the summer. The refit included new hull artwork and updated interiors.

In May 2014, it was announced that the ship would be renamed Costa Celebration and transferred to Costa Cruises in November 2014. After the Iberocruceros brand was discontinued, the ship underwent refurbishment and was renamed the Costa Celebration. On 21 November 2014, on the day before the ship was scheduled to depart on her inaugural voyage, it was announced that the vessel had been sold to an unnamed buyer. The next day, the Costa Celebration was removed from Costa's fleet and all bookings were cancelled. Passengers who had booked on Costa Celebration's future cruises were either refunded or rebooked on other ships.

On 23 December 2014, it was revealed that the ship had been purchased by the newly formed Bahamas Paradise Cruise Line, who would reuse the name Grand Celebration and sail out of the Port of Palm Beach in Riviera Beach, Florida starting in February 2015.

On 6 January 2015, the Grand Celebration arrived at the Port of Palm Beach for refit into Bahamas Paradise livery. During arrival, it was noticed that her Costa Celebration name was painted over with the Grand Celebration name, but the funnel retained the Costa livery.

The Grand Celebration was scheduled to depart for her inaugural cruise on 1 February 2015, however, due to technical difficulties, the voyage was cancelled. Repairs were made and the ship set sail on 3 February.

The ship continued to sail for the cruise line until March 2020 when the COVID-19 pandemic halted the cruise line industry. In November 2020, there were reports the ship had been sold to scrap. The company has announced the ship has been sold to a undisclosed buyer due to financial hardships associated with the cruise line industry being unable to operate due to the pandemic. She left Freeport, Bahamas on 12 November 2020 and arrived at Port Louis Anch, Mauritius on 30 December 2020 for refueling. At the same time, she was renamed Grand during refueling and her flag was changed to Saint Kitts and Nevis. The ship later set sail with its destination for Bhavnagar, India which is near where the Alang shipbreaking yard is located. The ship was beached in Alang for scrapping on 14 January 2021. On 9 March 2021, it was declared that the scrapping process on her has begun.

Incidents
 On the morning of 10 February 1989, MS Celebration collided with the Cuban freighter Captain San Luis, causing the latter to break in half and sink in 13 minutes. Three crew members of the Captain San Luis, including her captain, were missing and presumed dead. The freighter was hauling cement at the time of the collision and had been experiencing electrical problems which left the ship without lights, navigational equipment, or steering. The Celebration remained on-site, rescuing the 42 survivors from the water and transferring them to a Cuban navy ship and tugboat before continuing on to Miami.

References

External links

Cruise ships of Portugal
Ships built in Malmö
1986 ships
Ships of Carnival Cruise Line
Holiday-class cruise ships
Carnival Cruise Lines
Maritime incidents in 1989